Miaenia exigua is a species of beetle in the family Cerambycidae. It was described by Gahan in 1900.

References

Miaenia
Beetles described in 1900